Seigler is a surname. Notable people with the surname include:

Richard Seigler (born 1980), American football player and coach
Tommy Seigler (born 1938), American professional wrestler

See also
Seigler Springs, California, an unincorporated community in Lake County, California, United States